The 2020 Girls' EuroHockey Youth Championships was scheduled to be the 11th edition of the Girls' EuroHockey Youth Championship. The tournament was scheduled to be held alongside the men's tournament from 12 to 18 July 2020 in Kazan, Russia.

The tournament was canceled on 31 March 2020 due to the COVID-19 pandemic in Europe.

Qualified teams
The following teams have qualified for the 2020 EuroHockey Youth Championship:

See also
2020 Boys' EuroHockey Youth Championships

References

Girls' EuroHockey Youth Championships
Youth
EuroHockey Youth Championships
EuroHockey Youth Championships
EuroHockey Youth Championships